Keys of the Kingdom is the fourteenth album by the rock band the Moody Blues, released in 1991. Although some of the tracks recall the songwriting on Sur la Mer, the failure of Keys of the Kingdom to produce any major hit singles would mark the beginning of the Moodies' decline in popularity with mainstream audiences after their success in the MTV video generation.

The album saw the band beginning to return to a more airy rock oriented sound (similar to The Present), rather than the previous two albums' forays into synthesiser pop.  Flautist Ray Thomas plays more of a substantial role on this record, with his first ambient flute piece in eight years. It was recorded and mixed at four London studios: Olympic Studios, RG Jones Studios, Mayfair Studios and The Hit Factory (not to be confused with the NYC-based studio of the same name). Drum machines are still used heavily; Graeme Edge only performs on three songs, with session drummer Andy Duncan providing live drums on two more, and the rest being programmed.

Keyboardist Patrick Moraz was fired from the band after completing only a few tracks for this album, and he is listed as an 'additional' keyboard player.  After a lawsuit (broadcast by Court TV) filed by Moraz, their future album and re-release booklets would distance themselves from Moraz – e.g. removing him from photographs that originally featured him - and they never had any future keyboardists become official members of the band.

This was the last Moody Blues album before their extravagant concert at Red Rocks and a series of symphonic tours with orchestras.

Original track listing

Side one
"Say It with Love" (Justin Hayward) – 3:57 
"Bless the Wings (That Bring You Back)" (Hayward) – 5:10
"Is This Heaven?" (Hayward, John Lodge) – 4:04
"Say What You Mean (Parts 1 & 2)" (Hayward) – 5:31
"Lean on Me (Tonight)" (Lodge) – 4:58

Side two
"Hope and Pray" (Hayward) – 5:03
"Shadows on the Wall" (Lodge) – 5:07
"Once is Enough" (Hayward, Lodge) (Not put on vinyl LP (Europe only) or cassette, but included on CD format and 7-inch single) – 4:03 
"Celtic Sonant" (Ray Thomas) – 5:02
"Magic" (Lodge) – 5:11
"Never Blame the Rainbows for the Rain" (Hayward, Thomas) – 4:57

Personnel
Justin Hayward – vocals, guitars
John Lodge – vocals, bass guitar
Ray Thomas – vocals, flute
Graeme Edge – drums, percussion

Additional personnel 
Patrick Moraz – keyboards on "Say What You Mean", "Celtic Sonant" and "Magic"
Bias Boshell – keyboards, drum machine
Paul Bliss – keyboards, drum machine
Nigel Hitchcock – alto saxophone
Jamie Talbot – tenor saxophone
Pete Beachill – trombone
Guy Barker – trumpet
Andy Duncan – drums on "Is This Heaven?" and "Magic"

Charts

References

1991 albums
The Moody Blues albums
Albums produced by Tony Visconti
Albums produced by Christopher Neil
Polydor Records albums
Albums recorded at Olympic Sound Studios